Cabinet of Ministers of the USSR functioned as the administrative, executive body and the government after the Council of Ministers was dissolved. It consisted of the Prime Minister, his 7 deputies (2 first deputy Prime Ministers and 5 deputy Prime Ministers) and the 36 ministers and 1 State Committee of the Soviet Union. Its leading decision-making organ was the Presidium, which consisted of the prime minister, his deputies, and an Administrator of affairs.

The Cabinet of Ministers was to be the responsibility of the President of the Soviet Union and the Supreme Soviet and was accountable to both institutions. All newly formed Cabinets were to submit their program to the Supreme Soviet for approval. The Cabinet of Ministers was obliged to tender its resignation if the sitting president stepped down.

The Cabinet of Ministers was responsible for formulating and executing the All-Union state budget, administering defence enterprises and overseeing space research, implementing foreign policy, crime fighting, maintain defence and social security, and worked alongside the republican governments to develop financial and credit policy, administer fuel and power supplies and transport system, and developing welfare and social programs. In addition, it was responsible for coordinating All-Union policy on science, technology, patents, use of airspace, prices, general economic policy, housing, environmental protection and military appointments. It also had the right to issue decrees and resolutions (Law).

The Cabinet of Ministers existed alongside the Federation Council, the Presidential Council of the Soviet Union and other executive bodies that reported directly to the president. However, as the sole executive organ responsible for the ministers and the economy, it was the most important.

The ministries in the Cabinet were, including the KGB:
 Ministry of Agriculture & Food.
 Ministry of Automobile & Agricultural Machine Building.
 Ministry of Aviation Industry.
 Ministry of Civil Aviation.
 Ministry of Coal Industry.
 Ministry of Communications.
 Ministry of Construction of Oil & Gas Industry.
 Ministry of Culture.
 Ministry of Defence.
 Ministry of defence Industry.
 Ministry of Electrical Engineering,
 Ministry of Electronics Industry.
 Ministry of Environmental Protection.
 Ministry of Finance.
 Ministry of Fish Industry.
 Ministry of Foreign Affairs.
 Ministry of Foreign Economic Relations.
 Ministry of Forestry Industry.
 Ministry of General Machine Building.
 Ministry of Geology.
 Ministry of Health.
 Ministry of Installation & Special Construction Work.
 Ministry of The Interior.
 Ministry of Justice.
 Ministry of Machine Tool & Tool Building Industry.
 Ministry of Medical & Microbiological Industry.
 Ministry of Merchant Marine.
 Ministry of Metallurgy.
 Ministry of Nuclear Power Industry.
 Ministry of Oil and Gas Industry.
 Ministry of Power and Electrification.
 Ministry of Radio Industry.
 Ministry of Railways.
 Ministry of Shipbuilding.
 Ministry of Trade.
 Ministry of Transport Construction.

References

1991 establishments in the Soviet Union
1991 disestablishments in the Soviet Union